Javier Vega Jr. (June 17, 1978 – August 3, 2014) was an agent of the United States Border Patrol who was shot dead by Gustavo Tijerina Sandoval, an illegal alien from Mexico, near Santa Monica, Texas on August 3, 2014. His killer was sentenced to the death penalty, and Vega was honored as the namesake of a street in La Feria, Texas and a Border Patrol checkpoint in Sarita, Texas.

Early life
Vega was born on June 17, 1978, in La Feria, Cameron County, Texas. Prior to joining the Border Patrol, Vega had served in the United States Marine Corps. He was married, and he had three children.

Vega served in the Border Patrol from February 11, 2008, to August 3, 2014.

Murder and convictions
While on an off-duty trip near Santa Monica in Willacy County, Texas with his wife, children and parents, Vega was shot in the chest by Gustavo Tijerina Sandoval, an illegal alien from Mexico, who also shot his father, Javier Vega, Sr., in the hip. Sandoval got into his car with an accomplice and drove away. Vega's father shot back at the two men's car, who continued to drive for a few miles until their car broke down. The father survived but Javier Vega, Jr. died shortly after. 

Sandoval and another Mexican illegal alien, Ismael Hernandez Vallejo, who was with him at the time, were arrested the next day. The two men were originally from Matamoros, Tamaulipas. Sandoval had four prior arrests for illegal entry into the United States. He had also been charged with reckless driving in December 2006 and failed to appear in court; the charge had been dropped in February 2013.

In September 2016, the National Border Patrol Council said USBP had redesignated Vega's death as "in line of duty", leading to federal compensation for his family.

The two Mexican men were given jury trials. Gustavo Tijerina Sandoval was sentenced to death on June 5, 2018, and Ismael Hernandez Vallejo was given a fifty-year prison sentence on January 15, 2019.

Legacy
On December 16, 2017, a street was renamed in his honor in La Feria.

On March 20, 2019, the Border Patrol checkpoint in Sarita, Texas was renamed in his memory. The dedication was attended by Senators John Cornyn and Ted Cruz.

See also
Murders of Theodore L. Newton Jr. and George F. Azrak

References

Deaths by firearm in Texas
Murder in Texas
2014 murders in the United States
August 2014 crimes in the United States